Subbiraj Kakkar popularly known as Subbiraj was an Indian character actor in Hindi-language films and television. He was the son of the sister of veteran actor Prithviraj Kapoor named Kailash and thus a cousin of Raj Kapoor, Shammi Kapoor and Shashi Kapoor.

Career

His debut film was "Do Gunde". At that time he was working as the Studio Manager of famous R.K.Studio of the Kapoor family.

Subbiraj was well known for his acting in Hindi cinema mainly as a character artist. He was best known for his acting performance in the film “Ek Ruka Hua Faisla” released in 1986 in which he has acted in the role of “Juror no Ten” as an arrogant, hypocrite, foul-mouthed, and aggressive businessman. This film was the remake of Sidney Lumet movie “Twelve Angry Men.” He got the acclamation of both the critics and the audience for his acting in this movie. In 1991 he featured in another movie named as “Maa Ki Mamta” which was also a big hit. His other popular films include "Khiladi 420" in 2000, "International Khiladi" in 1999, "Ram Aur Shyam" in 1996.

Personal life
His father was the studio manager of R K Studios.

He married the actress Baby Naaz, of the Boot Polish movie fame, a classic of Raj Kapoor in 1954 who had received a distinction award at the 1955 Cannes Film Festival for her role in Boot Polish. They have two sons who are not related to the Film Industry. Subbiraj passed away in July 2007. Baby Naaz died before him in 1995.

His wife Naaz was his co-star in two of his movies: "Dekha Pyaar Tumhara" in 1963 and "Mera Ghar Mere Bachhe" in 1965.

Filmography

Television

References

External links
 

20th-century Indian male actors
21st-century Indian male actors
Male actors in Hindi television
Male actors from Mumbai
Male actors in Hindi cinema
2007 deaths